Shahrak-e Tavanir (also Romanized as Shahrak-e Tavānīr) is a village in Gachin Rural District, in the Central District of Bandar Abbas County, Hormozgan Province, Iran. At the 2006 census, it had a population of 1,701 people (372 families).

References 

Populated places in Bandar Abbas County